Pir Ishaq Gailani (born 1954) is a member of Afghanistan's national legislature, the Wolesi Jirga.
He founded the National Solidarity Movement of Afghanistan.
His family includes a number of Sufi religious leaders.

Pir Ishaq Gailani has a nephew, Pir Sayed Ishaq Gailani, who has also been elected to the Wolesi Jirga, from Paktika Province, but for a different political party.
His grandson, Sayed Mohmood Hasamuddeen Al-Gailani, also served in the Wolesi Jirga, representing Ghazni.

References

Politicians of Paktika Province
Members of the House of the People (Afghanistan)
National Solidarity Movement of Afghanistan politicians
Living people
1954 births